Caroline Cossey (born 31 August 1954) is a British model and actress who often worked under the name Tula, which she also used for two memoirs. She appeared in the 1981 James Bond film For Your Eyes Only. Following her appearance in the film, she was outed as transgender by British tabloid News of the World. In 1991, she became the first trans woman to pose for Playboy. Cossey has since then fought for her right to legally marry and be legally recognised as a woman.

Early life and transition 
Cossey was born in Brooke, Norfolk. Through puberty, Cossey was distinctly feminine in appearance due to XXXY syndrome.  In Cossey's autobiography My Story, she describes an unhappy childhood, where she suffered confusing feelings and bullying by peers due to her femininity. Growing up, Cossey's closest companion was her sister, Pam, with whom she played dress-up in their mother's clothes. Cossey left formal schooling when she was fifteen and found work in a clothing store and as a butcher's apprentice. At sixteen, she moved to London and worked at a variety of low-wage jobs.

Cossey started transitioning while working as an usherette in London's West End. By 17, Cossey was receiving hormone therapy, working full-time in a female gender role as a showgirl. Following breast augmentation surgery, Cossey worked as a showgirl in Paris and as a topless dancer in Rome to save up for sex reassignment surgery (SRS). After years of hormonal treatment and counseling, and legally changing her name, Cossey had her final surgery on 31 December 1974 at Charing Cross Hospital, London.

Modelling career and outing by the tabloid press 
Cossey now began an active social life as a woman, concealing her transition. Asked about her dating life, Cossey replied, "I'm afraid I went a little wild". She told tabloids she had a romance with the television presenter Des Lynam, though Lynam says he does not recall it. Lynam however mentions going on dates with her in his autobiography. Cossey worked as a model under the name "Tula". She appeared in top magazines such as Australian Vogue and Harper's Bazaar, and worked extensively as a glamour model. She was a Page Three Girl for the British tabloid The Sun and appeared in Playboy in 1991.

In 1978, Tula won a part on the game show 3-2-1. A tabloid journalist then contacted her, revealing he had discovered she was transgender, and planned to write about it. Other journalists researched her past, attempting to interview her family members. Cossey dropped out of the show, convincing the producers to release her from her contract. After this incident, Tula maintained a lower profile, accepting only smaller assignments.

Tula was cast as an extra in the 1981 James Bond film For Your Eyes Only. Shortly after the film's release, the tabloid News of the World came out with a front-page headline that read "James Bond Girl Was a Boy." By her own accounts, Tula was so upset she contemplated suicide. However, she continued her modelling career. Tula responded by releasing I Am a Woman, her first autobiography.

Personal life 
Tula became engaged to Count Glauco Lasinio, an Italian advertising executive, who was the first man to date her knowing of her past. He encouraged her to petition for changes in the British law concerning transsexuals. The engagement ended, but her legal efforts continued for seven years, eventually reaching the European Court of Human Rights.

In 1985, Tula appeared extensively in the video for The Power Station's "Some Like It Hot", also appearing in the band's video for "Get It On". After breaking up with Lasinio, Tula met Elias Fattal, a businessman, who was unaware of her history until he proposed marriage on St Valentine's Day 1988. When she told him, rather than rejecting her, he merely asked if she would convert to Judaism. She agreed. They were married on 21 May 1989, weeks after the European Court of Human Rights decided legally to recognise Tula as a woman. They returned from their honeymoon to find that the News of the World had published a story on their wedding.

On 27 September 1990, the European Court overturned its decision on a British government appeal. (The right of transgender people in the United Kingdom to change their legal sex would not be granted until the Gender Recognition Act 2004.) Tula returned to modelling, which she had given up four years earlier.

In 1991, Tula released My Story, her second autobiography. In it she gave details of her transition and her unsuccessful battle with the European Court. She was featured in the September 1991 issue of Playboy in the pictorial "The Transformation of Tula" as an acknowledged transgender person.

Tula married Canadian David Finch in 1992.

Bibliography

References

External links 

For Your Eyes Only Snopes.com, 11 August 2007

1954 births
English Jews
English female models
Intersex women
Intersex models
English LGBT actors
Living people
People from Brooke, Norfolk
Transgender actresses
Transgender female models
Converts to Judaism
Transgender Jews
Transgender memoirists
British women memoirists
21st-century LGBT people